Legousia (Venus' looking-glass) is a genus of flowering plants in the family Campanulaceae, native to Europe. Species in the genus used to be placed under genus Specularia along with plants in genera Triodanis and Heterocodon as well as some species in genus Campanula. However, the division has been confirmed evolutionarily comprehensive by a Campanulaceae phylogeny based on DNA molecular evidence.

Species
Legousia  species include:
 Legousia falcata 
 Legousia hybrida 
 Legousia julianii 
 Legousia pentagonia 
 Legousia scabra 
 Legousia skvortsovii 
Legousia snogerupii Tan, Biel & Sfikas. 2015
 Legousia speculum-veneris

Synonyms
 Apenula 
 Legouzia 
 Specularia 
 Pentagonia

References

Tan, K., Biel, B. and Sfikas, G., 2015. Legousia snogerupii (Campanulaceae), a new species from southeastern Kiklades, Greece. Phytotaxa, 201(1), pp.63-70.

Campanuloideae
Campanulaceae genera